Out of Control is a comprehensive double-disc set containing 34 songs from all stages of Ted Nugent's career, including tracks from his previous group The Amboy Dukes.

Track listing

CD 1
 "Baby, Please Don't Go" - 5:38
 "Journey to the Center of the Mind" - 3:34
 "You Talk Sunshine, I Breathe Fire" - 2:43
 "Gloria" (previously unreleased) - 6:07 (It was disputed by Nugent on 102.7 WWBR as not done by The Amboy Dukes)
 "Call of the Wild" - 4:46
 "Great White Buffalo" - 4:57
 "Stranglehold" - 8:22
 "Stormtroopin'" - 3:04
 "Hey Baby" - 3:59
 "Motor City Madhouse" - 4:33
 "Free-for-All" - 3:20
 "Dog Eat Dog" - 4:03
 "Turn It Up" - 3:36
 "Street Rats" (alternate version with Derek St. Holmes) - 4:14
 "Magic Party" (previously unreleased) - 2:42
 "Hammerdown" - 4:07

 Rob Grange appears on Tracks 1, 5, 6, 7, 8, 9, 10, 11, 14, 15 and 16

CD 2
 "Cat Scratch Fever" - 3:38
 "Wang Dang Sweet Poontang" - 3:15
 "Live It Up" - 3:59
 "Home Bound" - 4:43
 "Out of Control" - 3:27
 "Carol" (live) - 4:02
 "Just What the Doctor Ordered" (live) - 5:27
 "Yank Me, Crank Me" (live) - 4:42
 "Walking Tall" (live) - 3:53
 "Need You Bad" - 4:17
 "Weekend Warriors" - 3:05
 "Paralyzed" - 4:01
 "State of Shock" - 3:21
 "Wango Tango" - 4:48
 "Scream Dream" - 3:18
 "Terminus Eldorado" - 4:14
 "Jailbait" (live) - 5:16
 "Little Miss Dangerous" - 4:48

 Rob Grange appears on Tracks 1, 2, 3, 4, 5, 7 and 8
 John Sauter appears on Tracks 2, 3, 4, 5, 6, 7, 8, 9, 10, and 11

References

1993 compilation albums
Ted Nugent albums
Epic Records compilation albums
Legacy Recordings compilation albums